Eli Mandel (December 3, 1922 – September 3, 1992) was a Canadian poet, editor of many Canadian anthologies, and literary academic.

Biography
Eli Mandel died in relative obscurity. A series of strokes had left him unable to write and, as a result, Mandel had receded from public view long before his death.

He was born Elias Wolf Mandel in Estevan, Saskatchewan, Canada to Russian Jewish parents who had emigrated from the Ukraine, and grew up the Canadian prairies during the Great Depression. After a job working for a pharmacist who, landed him a position serving in Canada's Medical Corps during World War II, it has been said Mandel returned a forever emotionally distraught man who was destined to live the rest of his life without a sense of belonging. This helps explain the alienation that is illustrated throughout his writings.

He studied English at the University of Saskatchewan attaining a Master of Arts degree in 1950. He received a PhD from the University of Toronto in 1957.

From 1953 to 1957, Mandel taught at the Royal Military College Saint-Jean. Later, he taught English and creative writing at the University of Alberta, University of Victoria, University of Toronto, and York University. He also taught Canadian studies at the University of Calgary.

Besides his poetry, he wrote other critical works such as his 1969 essay on fellow poet Irving Layton.

He was married to his first wife, Miriam Mandel, for 18 years. The couple had two children, Evie and Charles. In 1967 they divorced and he married Ann Hardy. They had one child, Sara.

Publishing poetry in the early 1950s, Eli Mandel's first significant collection was entitled Minotaur poems (1954), and it appeared in the contact press anthology Trio (1954).

His poetry was published in 1954 in Trio, an anthology of poems by Mandel, Gael Turnbull, and Phyllis Webb published by Raymond Souster's Contact Press.

His first book was Fuseli poems (1960).

His works seem to have been deeply influenced by World War II, especially all the horrors of the Jewish concentration camps. Despite the lack of direct references to the war until Stony Plain (1973), his work illustrates many grim and morbid images of despair, destruction written with a tone of inescapable pessimism.

Mandel's style was contemplative and intellectual - "an ironic poet, rather than an angry one". The lack of emotion heightens a hopeless outlook, a central feature in all of his writing. His early works appear to have been written for "a scholarly rather than public audience" due to their literary complexity. In his later work, however, starting with the poetry of Black and Secret Man (1964), Mandel simplifies the syntax and uses more colloquial language. While the thoughtful view remained as it was in his earlier work, a wittier tone replaced the previously somber one.

He was also a critic and editor, producing a monograph on his fellow-poet Irving Layton, and an anthology, Poetry62/Poésie62(1962), which he co-edited with Jean-Guy Pilon. Additionally, he championed many otherwise unnoticed newcomers of the 1950s such as Al Purdy, Milton Acorn, D. G. Jones and Alden Nowlan.

Critical Reception
Eli Mandel's book, The Family Romance (1986), has been characterized by his quotations from essays on Hugh MacLennan and Northrop Frye’s The Great Code. Both excerpts exemplify Mandel’s questioning of whatever is viewed as orthodoxy. He refuses to let pass what most people simply accept. In this essay collection, it has been recognized that the first piece, Auschwitz and Poetry, is the most powerful and significant and the last of this series of essays, The Border League: American ‘West’ and Canadian ‘Region’, seems to be the least successful.

The compilation of Mandel’s work, The Other Harmony: the Collected Poetry of Eli Mandel, is a two volume collection, with the first including Mandel’s contributions to Trio, as well has his books Fuseli Poems, An Idiot Joy, Stony Plain, and others. It has been acknowledged as the more noteworthy of the two volumes in terms of its primary material.

Eli Mandel's literary papers are held by the University of Manitoba Archives and Special Collections.

Recognition
Mandel won the 1968 Governor General's Award for An Idiot Joy.

In 1982 he was elected a Fellow of the Royal Society of Canada.

In 1989 he was made an honorary Doctor of Letters by York University.

Publications

Poetry
 1954: Trio: First Poems by Gael Turnbull, Phyllis Webb, and Eli Mandel. Toronto: Contact Press, 1954.
 1960: Fuseli Poems
 Black and Secret Man. (Toronto: Ryerson, 1964)
 1967: An Idiot Joy (Hurtig)
 Crusoe: Poems Selected and New (Toronto: Anansi, 1973)
 1973: Stony Plain (Porcepic) 
 1977: Out Of Place (Porcepic) 
 1981: Life Sentence: Poems and Journals: 1976-1980
 2000: The Other Harmony: The Collected Poetry of Eli Mandel, compilation (Canadian Plains Research Centre)

Criticism
 1966: Criticism: The Silent-Speaking Words, Eight Talks for CBC Radio (CBC Publications)
 1969: Irving Layton (Forum House), edited by William French
 1977: Another Time (Porcepic) 
 1986: The Family Romance (Turnstone)

Other works
 1981: Dreaming Backwards, compilation of revisions from 1954 to 1981 (General)

Edited
Poets of Contemporary Canada, Toronto: McClelland & Stewart (New Canadian Library).

Discography
 2001: Celebration: Famous Canadian Poets CD Canadian Poetry Association —       (CD#2) (with Dorothy Livesay )

See also

Canadian literature
Canadian poetry
List of Canadian poets

References
 Kizuk, R. Alexander. "Desert Words: Eli Mandel’s Poetry" http://www.uwo.ca/english/canadianpoetry/cpjrn/vol49/kizuk.htm 
 M. Casey, Diana. "Eli Mandel"  Great Neck Publishing
 
 
 Matthews, Lawrence. "The Martian of Estevan". ECW Press Ltd, 2001

Notes

External links
 OneZeroZero: Eli Mandel, accessed 10 July 2006
 Sask 2005: Eli Mandel profile, accessed 10 July 2006
 University of Manitoba collections: Eli Mandel fonds summary, accessed 10 July 2006
 Mandel, The Canadian Encyclopedia accessed 20 November 2019
 "A Little More on Eli Mandel's Greatness

1922 births
1992 deaths
20th-century Canadian poets
Canadian male poets
Jewish Canadian writers
Canadian people of Russian-Jewish descent
Fellows of the Royal Society of Canada
Governor General's Award-winning poets
Jewish poets
People from Estevan
Writers from Saskatchewan
University of Saskatchewan alumni
University of Toronto alumni
Academic staff of York University
20th-century Canadian male writers
Canadian military personnel of World War II